Levstiki is a small settlement in the Municipality of Ribnica in southern Slovenia. It lies north of the village of Sveti Gregor, just off the main road to Velike Lašče. The area is part of the traditional region of Lower Carniola and is now included in the Southeast Slovenia Statistical Region.

References

External links

Levstiki on Geopedia

Populated places in the Municipality of Ribnica